The Bir Sreshtho, is the highest military award of Bangladesh. It was awarded to seven freedom fighters who showed utmost bravery and died in action for their nation. They are considered martyrs.

The other three gallantry awards are named, in decreasing order of importance, Bir Uttom, Bir Bikrom and Bir Protik. All of these awards were introduced immediately after the Liberation War in 1971.

Recipients of the Bir Srestho
All the recipients of this award were killed in action during the Liberation War of 1971. The award was published by the Bangladesh Gazette on 15 December 1973. It is the highest military award of Bangladesh, similar to the American Medal of Honor or the British Victoria Cross. It has only been given in 1973 to seven people. Listed below are the people who have received the Bir Srestho. They are all considered 'Shaheed' (Martyrs).

Bangladesh Army

Bangladesh Navy

Bangladesh Air Force

Border Guards Bangladesh 

''Note: When referring to martyrs, the word 'shaheed' is often put before each individual's name as a mark of respect. The list has been prepared like the declaration by the Bangladesh Gazette.

See also
 Bir Uttom
 Bir Bikrom
 Bir Protik
 Medals of the Bangladesh Armed Forces

References

Military awards and decorations of Bangladesh
Courage awards
Aftermath of the Bangladesh Liberation War